Koppal Lok Sabha constituency is one of the 28 Lok Sabha (parliamentary) constituencies in Karnataka state in southern India. This constituency covers the entire Koppal district and parts of Raichur and Bellary districts.

Assembly segments
Koppal Lok Sabha constituency presently comprises the following eight Legislative Assembly segments:

Members of Parliament

Election results

See also
 Kushtagi
 Koppal district
 List of Constituencies of the Lok Sabha

References

Lok Sabha constituencies in Karnataka
Koppal district